Move Me is a 2003 Danish comedy film directed by Morten Arnfred. Birthe Neumann received both a Robert Award for Best Actress in a Leading Role and a Bodil Award for Best Actress in a Leading Role for her role as Sara.

Cast 
 Birthe Neumann – Sara
 Jesper Lohmann – Robert
 Ditte Gråbøl – Sus
  – Bo
 Niels Olsen – Holger
  – Jan
  – Amalie
 Jakob Slot Pedersen – Tim
 Klaus Bondam – Henrik
  – Anita
 Gyrd Løfqvist – Far

References

External links 
 
 
 

2003 comedy films
2003 films
Danish comedy films
2000s Danish-language films